Hopewell Junction is a hamlet and census-designated place (CDP) in Dutchess County, New York, United States. The population was 1330 at the 2020 census. It is part of the Poughkeepsie–Newburgh–Middletown, NY Metropolitan Statistical Area as well as the larger New York–Newark–Bridgeport, NY-NJ-CT-PA Combined Statistical Area.

Hopewell Junction is located within the town of East Fishkill. It was originally a railroad junction where the Newburgh, Dutchess and Connecticut Railroad met the New York and New England Railroad and Dutchess County Railroad. All three became part of the New York, New Haven and Hartford Railroad system, and the ND&C to the southwest and the NY&NE are now owned by the Housatonic Railroad and used by Metro-North for equipment moves between its Hudson Line and Harlem Line. The last remaining section of passenger line, a branch from Pine Plains, south through Milbrook, to Hopewell Junction, to Beacon, lost its passenger service at some point between 1932 and 1938. The closest passenger facility is Beacon station on Metro-North's Hudson Line.  Today, Hopewell Junction sits astride the bike/walk Empire State Trail where it is the juncture between the Dutchess Rail Trail running west to the Walkway Over the Hudson at Poughkeepsie, New York and the more recently constructed Maybrook Trailway winding through the hills to Brewster, New York to almost meet the Putnam County Trailway and its continuations to New York City.

It was ranked #31 on Money magazine's "Most Desirable Places to Live" for 2005.

Geography
Hopewell Junction is located near the center of the town of East Fishkill at  (41.584, -73.806), to the north of Fishkill Creek.

Demographics

As of the census of 2000, there were 2,610 people, 894 households, and 688 families residing in the CDP. The population density was 923.4 per square mile (356.1/km2). There were 914 housing units at an average density of 323.4/sq mi (124.7/km2). The racial makeup of the CDP was 92.26% White, 1.80% African American, 0.27% Native American, 3.91% Asian, 0.42% from other races, and 1.34% from two or more races. Hispanic or Latino of any race were 3.98% of the population.

There were 894 households, out of which 42.4% had children under the age of 18 living with them, 65.9% were married couples living together, 8.1% had a female householder with no husband present, and 23.0% were non-families. 19.6% of all households were made up of individuals, and 5.8% had someone living alone who was 65 years of age or older. The average household size was 2.91 and the average family size was 3.37.

In the CDP, the population was spread out, with 20.9% under the age of 18, 6.5% from 18 to 24, 29.1% from 25 to 44, 35.5% from 45 to 64, and 10.0% who were 65 years of age or older. For every 100 females, there were 96.7 males. For every 100 females age 18 and over, there were 94.9 males.

The median income for a household in the CDP was $106,042, and the median income for a family was $135,625. Males had a median income of $49,750 versus $33,092 for females. The per capita income for the CDP was $26,844. About 2.3% of families and 4.3% of the population were below the poverty line, including 5.3% of those under age 18.

Transportation
Hopewell Junction is served by Dutchess County Public Transit's route F.

Trump National Golf Club, Hudson Valley
Trump National Golf Club, Hudson Valley is located in Hopewell Junction. Originally opened as Branton Woods Golf Club and also part of an original 300-acre former bison farm.

Notable people
Henry Morgenthau, Jr., Secretary of the Treasury under Franklin D. Roosevelt; started Fishkill Farms orchard in Hopewell Junction
Joe Panik, Miami Marlins second baseman previously with the San Francisco Giants
Trenten Anthony Beram, Double Gold Medalist Sprinter representing the Philippines
Jason Scott, technology historian and archivist
Ilya Bolotowsky, famous Russian Abstract Painter summered on Palen Road

References

External links

 "Historic Hopewell Junction" video

Census-designated places in New York (state)
Hamlets in New York (state)
Poughkeepsie–Newburgh–Middletown metropolitan area
Census-designated places in Dutchess County, New York
Hamlets in Dutchess County, New York